Charles Thornton may refer to:

 Tex Thornton (1913–1981), American businessman
 Charles Thornton (cricketer) (1850–1929), English cricketer
 Charles "Cookie" Thornton, resident of Kirkwood, Missouri involved, in Kirkwood City Council shooting
 Charles Irving Thornton (1841–1842), American infant from the state of Virginia
 Charles Jonas Thornton (1850–1932), political figure in Durham, Ontario
 Charles Wade Thornton (1764–1854), British military officer
 Charles E. Thornton (1930s–1985), medical reporter and the first American journalist killed in Afghanistan after the Soviet invasion of 1979